Dawley and Stirchley railway station was a station in Dawley, Shropshire, England. The station was opened in 1861 and closed in 1952.

References

Further reading

Disused railway stations in Shropshire
Railway stations in Great Britain opened in 1861
Railway stations in Great Britain closed in 1952
Former London and North Western Railway stations